Kalawad is a village in Dharwad district of Karnataka, India.

Demographics 
As of the 2011 Census of India there were 487 households in Kalawad and a total population of 2,617 consisting of 1,370 males and 1,247 females. There were 358 children ages 0-6.

References

Villages in Dharwad district